is a Japanese television drama originally aired by TV Asahi from June to September 2006. The series centers on three high school students involved in their school's cross-dressing princess system, and was loosely based on the manga Princess Princess by Mikiyo Tsuda.

Plot
Fujimori Academy is an elite all-boys boarding school with a unique Princess system: each year three freshmen are chosen to become the school princesses, attending school functions and cheering the clubs and teams dressed as girls to the spirits of the students, who are not able to regularly see girls in the school grounds.

Mikoto Yutaka is one of the chosen for Princess duty in his junior year, along with students Yujiro Shihoudani and Tooru Kouno. At first very contrary to joining the Princess system, Mikoto is eventually convinced by the other Princesses. But just as Mikoto is reluctantly accepting his role, the mysterious Otoya Hanazono transfers into the school. Dissatisfied with the current Princesses' half-hearted efforts and accusing the Student Council of being neglectful of the students' wishes, Otoya creates his own team (the Dark Princesses) to rival the Princesses, and nominates himself candidate for the New School Council.

Mikoto is caught in the fight between Otoya and the current Student Council, unsure of which side to stand for. He also has to deal with his conflicting feelings towards Otoya, and how they affect both his friendship with Yujiro and Tooru and his loyalty to the Princess system. In this process, he comes to understand the true meaning of being a Princess, and finally embraces his role, putting his man's pride aside in favor of the Princesses' pride.

Cast
 Kenta Kamakari as Mikoto Yutaka
 Ray Fujita as Yuujirou Shihoudani
 Takeru Satoh as Touru Kouno
 Yuichi Nakamura as Otoya Hanazono
 Kento Shibuya as Kurou Minamoto
 Kazuma as Ranta Mori
 Takumi Saito as Shuuya Arisada
 Osamu Adachi as Akira Sakamoto
 Hideo Ishiguro as Haruka Kujouin
 Shota Minami as Masayuki Koshino
 Haruhiko Sato as Wataru Harue
 Hiroshi Yoshihara as Takahiro Tadasu
 Kohei Yamamoto as Kaoru Natashou

Adaptations
The live action version of the Princess Princess series differs in many points from its manga and anime counterparts, the most significant changes being the main character and the Black Princesses. In the manga and anime versions, Tooru is the protagonist, while in the drama series the focus is on Mikoto. The Black Princesses were original characters created by the manga author exclusively for the drama version.

The drama also excluded all female characters, including Mikoto's girlfriend. That relationship was exchanged for one
heavy on boys love overtones between Mikoto and Otoya.

Episodes

Media
A series of character-related merchandise items was released through the series' original run, including theme songs performed by the actors.

Visual
 Official Photo Album Princess Princess D
 Released August 2006, 
 Princess Princess D Making Book
 Released October 2006,

Music
 Princess Princess D Character Song Series Vol.1: Treasure - Hime (Kenta Kamakari, Ray Fujita & Takeru Satoh)
 1. Treasure
 2. 

 Princess Princess D Character Song Series Vol.2: Shiawase no Yokan - Kurohime (Yuichi Nakamura, Kento Shibuya & Kazuma)
 1. 
 2. 

 Princess Princess D Character Song Series Vol.3: Hateshinaku sumiwataru sora no mukou mezashite - Kenta Kamakari
 1. 
 2. 

 Princess Princess D Character Song Series Vol.4: Raindrops - Ray Fujita
 1. 
 2. 

 Princess Princess D Character Song Series Vol.5: YES! - Takeru Satoh
 1. 
 2.

External links
 Pony Canyon release website
 Japanese Wikipedia article on プリンセス・プリンセス

Japanese drama television series
Japanese high school television series
Japanese LGBT-related television shows
TV Asahi television dramas
2006 Japanese television series debuts
2006 Japanese television series endings
Television series about teenagers

ja:プリンセス・プリンセス (漫画)